Super Tuesday 2008, Super Duper Tuesday, Mega Tuesday, Giga Tuesday, Tsunami Tuesday, and The Tuesday of Destiny are names for February 5, 2008, the day on which the largest simultaneous number of state U.S. presidential primary elections in the history of U.S. primaries were held. Twenty-four states and American Samoa held either caucuses or primary elections for one or both parties on this date. Furthermore, the week-long Democrats Abroad Global Primary began on this day.

The large number of states that held elections on February 5 could have shortened the period between the first caucus in Iowa, on January 3, 2008, and the de facto selection of a party's nominee to just a few weeks. Super Tuesday 2008 saw 52% of the Democratic and 41% of the Republican delegates awarded by early February 2008. By comparison, only about 1% of nominating convention delegates had been selected by that point in the 2000 election cycle.  It was held approximately one month before Super Tuesday II.

Names and prior election cycles
The name "Super Duper Tuesday" is a reference to earlier Super Tuesdays, the dates on which the largest number of presidential primaries took place. The term "Super Duper Tuesday" has been repeatedly re-coined to refer to even more states holding their primaries on this date, with the first recorded usage so far found dating back to 1985. In 2004, Super Tuesday fell on March 2.
In 2004, the equivalent cohort of primaries, on February 3, 2004, was called "Mini-Tuesday"—only seven states held their primaries on that date.

On June 3, 2007, the name "Tsunami Tuesday"—conveying the potential of the large number of simultaneous primaries to completely change the political landscape—was mentioned on Meet the Press during a round-table discussion with presidential campaign strategists James Carville, Bob Shrum, Mary Matalin, and Mike Murphy.

Super Tuesday in 2008 occurred during Mardi Gras and on the day of the New York Giants Super Bowl victory parade. Voting was hampered in several states by a major tornado outbreak that killed 57 people, and competed with the primaries for the news. (Due to such influence, the outbreak was named after the primaries.)

Scheduling

As of February 2007, eight states planned to hold primary or caucus elections on Super Tuesday, February 5, 2008: Alabama, Arkansas, Delaware, Missouri, New Mexico Democrats, North Dakota, Oklahoma, Utah, and West Virginia Republicans‡. However to increase their importance in the candidate selection process, several states moved up their contests, which some pundits criticized as being "pure self-interest."

The following states changed their elections to February 5: Alaska, Arizona, California, Colorado, Connecticut, Georgia, Idaho Democrats, Illinois, Kansas Democrats†, Massachusetts, Minnesota, Montana Republicans§, New Jersey, New York, and Tennessee.

In an attempt to keep states from moving their primary or caucus elections even earlier, the Democratic National Committee and Republican National Committee established penalties for states holding elections earlier than February 5, 2008. As a result, the Democratic National Committee controversially stripped the states of Michigan and Florida of all pledged convention delegates. The Republican National Committee has reduced by half the number of convention delegates from five states: Wyoming, New Hampshire, South Carolina, Florida, and Michigan.

Response
Advocates for earlier elections point out that voters could have fewer candidates to select from with a later contest, because candidates who do not fare well in the early primaries and caucuses often drop out. Additionally, presidential campaigns spend large sums of money on advertising, hotel rooms, and campaign staff, which can be an economic boon to states holding earlier elections.

Critics of the earlier polling date claim it will compress the primary campaign cycle down to a three-week national campaign where only financially well-off candidates can compete. CNN political pundit Bill Schneider states:

Those states may move up on the calendar because they want a cut of the action. They want less attention paid to small states like Iowa and New Hampshire and more attention paid to big, diverse states like Florida and California. To run in those big states, you need big money and national name recognition. Obscure contenders need not apply.

Others indicate it will ultimately leave voters out of the process. In a BBC News interview, William F. Galvin, the Massachusetts Secretary of the Commonwealth said:

The people who are being left out of this are the voters, especially those who aren't active in party affairs ... There won't be enough time for voters to focus on these candidates.

Regardless of the number of states moving their election dates earlier and earlier, New Hampshire vigorously maintained its 'first in the nation' primary status. By New Hampshire state law, the secretary of state has sole discretion to set the date of the primary. Bill Gardner, the Secretary of State of New Hampshire for the past 31 years, did not rule out any dates for the primary election, and even intimated that "it could be this year 2007." Ultimately, however, the New Hampshire primary was held on January 8, 2008.

Delegate allocation

Democratic

Under Democratic Party rules, all delegates were awarded via proportional representation, with a minimum 15% threshold required to receive delegates. A total of 1,664 delegates were pledged by the results of the February 5 votes.

Republican

The Republican Party did not mandate a proportional representation system for delegate selection, but instead allowed each state to determine its selection process. A total of 1,069 delegates were pledged by the results of the February 5 votes.

Results

Democrats

Republicans

See also
 Mini-Tuesday
 Super Tuesday
 Super Tuesday II, 2008
 2008 Super Tuesday tornado outbreak

Notes
 The New Mexico Democratic Caucus came down to provisional ballots. The counting process took 9 days to complete.
 † The Kansas state legislature voted to neither fund nor hold a primary in 2008.
 ‡ West Virginia Republicans will select 18 of their 30 delegates on February 5, with the final 12 chosen on May 13.
 § Montana Republicans chose to select delegates using a "closed caucus" comprising approximately 3,000 Republican elected officials and state party officials, such as precinct captains.
 ¤ American Samoa is an unincorporated territory of the United States with three delegates to the Democratic National Convention, but no vote in the Presidential election.
 (C) denotes states and territories holding caucuses.
 (WTA) means Winner Takes All, and applies solely to Republican contests.
Popular Vote Percentages reflect the percentage within each party, not state overall total votes cast.

References

External links
 State-by-state primary and caucus schedule by The Boston Globe
 2008 Democratic Calendar by The New York Times
 2008 Republican Calendar by The New York Times
 Select2008 - Comparisons and live polling on presidential candidates' positions and program
 Election Center 2008: Primary Results by date - Elections & Politics news from CNN.com

 

ko:슈퍼 화요일